The Scribbler is the second album by Shinjuku Thief, released in 1992 through Dorobo Records.

Track listing

Personnel 
Shinjuku Thief
François Tétaz – instruments, arrangement, production
Darrin Verhagen – instruments, arrangement, production
Production and additional personnel
Paula Francis – vocals on "Degrees of Acquittal"
Richard Grant – photography, design
Garry Havrillay – mastering
Mark Stafford – guitar on "Vogelfrei I & II"

References

External links 
 

1992 albums
Shinjuku Thief albums